The Immanuel bus attack was an ambush attack by Palestinian militants against Israeli civilians on 16 July 2002. It was carried out by three Palestinians disguised as Israeli soldiers. The attack came less than a year after the 2001 Immanuel bus attack.

The attackers first detonated a roadside bomb next to an armored civilian Dan No. 189 bus. Immediately afterwards, the assailants opened fire and threw hand grenades at the passengers. Nine Israelis were killed in the attack and 20 people suffered various degrees of injuries.

The attack
On Tuesday afternoon, 16 July 2002, three armed Palestinians militants disguised as Israeli soldiers planted a roadside bomb beside the road leading to the Jewish settlement of Immanuel, about 200 meters before the entrance to the town. After placing the bomb, the assailants ambushed a bus on its way from Bnei Brak.

At about 15:00 an armored Dan bus line 189, en route to Immanuel from Bnei Brak, approached the site as the roadside bomb exploded. As a result of the explosion, the bus was immobilized. The assailants fired small arms at the bus and threw hand grenades at the passengers through its roof and windows.

Nine people were killed in the attack and 20 people suffered various degrees of injuries.

See also
 Israeli casualties of war

References

External links 
 Israel arrest 16 in wake of attacks - published on The Vindicator on July 19, 2002
 Terrorist attack on bus at Emmanuel - July 16, 2002 - published on the Israeli Foreign Ministry website
 Eighth Immanuel victim was too young to have a name - published on the Haaretz on July 18, 2002
 Israel searches for bus attackers  - published on CNN on July 17, 2002

Spree shootings in Israel
Mass murder in 2002
Improvised explosive device bombings in Israel
Attacks on buses by Palestinian militant groups
Palestinian suicide bomber attacks against buses
Terrorist incidents in the West Bank in 2002
Terrorist attacks attributed to Palestinian militant groups
Terrorist incidents in the Palestinian territories
Murdered Israeli children
July 2002 events in Asia